"Change" is a single from American Idol finalist, Kimberley Locke, the first from her Based on a True Story album, after plans on promoting Supawoman as the lead single were canceled. Kimberley, with the assistance of Ty Lacy & Dennis Matkosky (LeAnn Rimes, Keith Urban), wrote the song about the crossroads she reached when deciding whether or not to call off her engagement in 2005.

Track listings and formats
US promotional single - CURBD-2011
 "Change" (AC edit) – 3:30
 "Change" (album version) – 3:58

US promotional single - CURBD-2031
 "Change" (radio edit) – 3:54
 "Change" (Jason Nevins dance radio edit) – 3:57

UK promotional maxi single - Almighty Remixes
 "Change" (7" Almighty radio mix) – 4:09
 "Change" (12" Almighty mix) – 7:38
 "Change" (Almighty Dub) – 7:37

US single - iTunes exclusive
 "Change" (Album version) – 3:58
 "Change" (Jason Nevins dance pop edit) – 3:57
 "Change" (Jason Nevins dance radio edit) – 3:57

US Remixes Maxi-Single - iTunes exclusive
 "Change" (Jason Nevins club radio edit) – 3:59
 "Change" (Scotty K radio edit) – 3:26
 "Change" (Bronleewe & Bose radio edit) – 3:26
 "Change" (Almighty radio edit) – 4:11
 "Change" (Jason Nevins extended club mix) – 7:22
 "Change" (Almighty extended mix) – 7:40
 "Change" (Scotty K Vocal Klub mix) – 6:51
 "Change" (Bronleewe & Bose Club mix) – 5:42

Charts

1 Remixed dance versions.

Billboard review
"American Idol" alumna Kimberley Locke has scored five hits at AC radio, including No. 1s "Jingle Bells" last December and "Up on the Housetop" a year before. Wisely, new single from upcoming sophomore project focuses on that core, albeit with enough of a contemporary edge to indulge her youthful profile — and perhaps drum up like support at adult top 40. "Change" rocks harder than the pop imprint of debut top 40 hit "8th World Wonder" and a bit less than the brusque, more urban "Wrong," mediating middle ground for a song that could make the grade across several formats. At this point, pop radio appears hesitant to embrace most Idols, so this persuasive effort is tailor-made to deliver on Locke's promise as a potential signature at adult formats. —Chuck Taylor

Music video
Filmed in Nashville on January 9, 2007, the music video was shot by award winning director Roman White.  Roman has directed videos for such artists as Carrie Underwood ("Jesus, Take the Wheel", "Before He Cheats", "Don't Forget to Remember Me"), Hootie and the Blowfish ("One Love"), and Lonestar ("Mr. Mom").  The video debuted on February 7, 2007 on AmericanIdol.com and was added into rotation on VH1 on April 14. The video follows Kimberley walking alone through the city on a cold winter's night. A promotional dance remixed version of the video was also produced and distributed to danceclubs.

See also
 Number-one dance hits of 2007 (USA)

External links

2007 singles
Kimberley Locke songs
Songs written by Jess Cates
Music videos directed by Roman White
Songs written by Dennis Matkosky
2007 songs
Curb Records singles
Song recordings produced by Dan Muckala
Songs written by Ty Lacy